The Yellow Flag (German: Die gelbe Flagge) is a 1937 German drama film directed by Gerhard Lamprecht and starring Hans Albers, Olga Tschechowa and Dorothea Wieck. It was shot at the Babelsberg Studios in Berlin. 
The film's sets were designed by the art director Ludwig Reiber. Location filming took place in Yugoslavia.

Synopsis
An adventurer, Peter Diercksen, travels to South America to guide an expedition into the jungle. However, when the ship is quarantined he believes he has contracted a serious fever. He does not accompany the trip, which runs into major problems. Later he is able to go to the rescue of the survivors including the American journalist Helen Roeder whom he is in love with.

Cast

References

Bibliography 
 Rentschler, Eric. The Ministry of Illusion: Nazi Cinema and Its Afterlife. Harvard University Press, 1996.

External links 
 

1937 films
1930s adventure drama films
German adventure drama films
Films of Nazi Germany
1930s German-language films
Films directed by Gerhard Lamprecht
Films set in South America
Films set in Buenos Aires
German black-and-white films
1937 drama films
1930s German films
Films shot at Babelsberg Studios